Glenapp or Glen App may refer to:

 Glenapp a settlement in Ballantrae, Scotland
 Glenapp Castle
 The Viscount of Glennapp
 Glen App Moor, part of Glen App and Galloway Moors
 The ship, Glenapp, a refrigerated vessel and the commodore's ship in Convoy SC 122 in the Battle of the Atlantic
Glenapp, Queensland, a neighbourhood and railway siding in south-east Queensland, Australia

Geology
 Glenn App Fault, part of the Southern Uplands Fault
 Glenn App Sediment an Ordovician sediment
 The Glen App Conglomerate